James Frew (4 June 1895 – 25 October 1985) was a Scottish footballer who played in the Football League for Carlisle United, Chelsea and Southend United.

References

1895 births
1985 deaths
Scottish footballers
Sportspeople from East Ayrshire
People from Mauchline
Association football defenders
English Football League players
Scottish Football League players
Scottish Junior Football Association players
Lugar Boswell Thistle F.C. players
Lanemark F.C. players
Nithsdale Wanderers F.C. players
Kilmarnock F.C. players
Chelsea F.C. players
Southend United F.C. players
Carlisle United F.C. players